This is a list of music of the Maison Ikkoku series. It lists individual theme and other songs, singles, as well as music, drama, and collection albums from the anime and live-action releases as well as game soundtracks.

Theme songs
Maison Ikkoku had an anime television series (96 episodes from March 1986 to March 1988), a live-action film (10 October 1986), an anime television film (February 1988), three OVAs (1988-1992), and a two episode live-action film series (2007-2008). For the most part, all of them had different theme and incidental music.

Television series themes
The opening and ending theme songs in the anime television series changed periodically, and were sung by several different popular singers and groups from Japan and one from Ireland, including Anzen Chitai, Takao Kisugi, Kiyonori Matsuo, Kōzō Murashita, Gilbert O'Sullivan, Picasso, and Yuki Saito.

Opening themes
"Kanashimi yo Konnichi wa" by Yuki Saito (episodes 1-23, 25-37)
"Alone Again (Naturally)" by Gilbert O'Sullivan (episode 24)
"Suki Sa" by Anzen Chitai (episodes 38-52)
"Sunny Shiny Morning" by Kiyonori Matsuo (episodes 53-76)
"Hidamari" by Kōzō Murashita (episodes 77-96)

Ending themes
"Ashita Hareru ka" by Takao Kisugi (episodes 1-14)
"Ci-ne-ma" by Picasso (episodes 15-23, 25-33)
"Get Down" by Gilbert O'Sullivan (episode 24)
"Fantasy" by Picasso (episodes 34-52)
"Sayonara no Dessan" by Picasso (episodes 53-76)
"Begin the Night" by Picasso (episodes 77-96)

Live-action movie theme
The live action film, released 10 October 1986 through Toei and Kitty Film in Japan, reused the two Gilbert O'Sullivan songs as themes. "Alone Again (Naturally)" and "Get Down" had previously been used as the theme songs for episode 24 of the anime television series on 3 September 1986. Outside of those two themes, the soundtrack for the film was composed by Joe Hisaishi.

Anime television movie theme
It was released as a single on 3 February 1988 by Kitty Records. It reached #21 on the Oricon charts and sold over 260,000 copies.

OVA themes
There were three OVAs released from 1988-1992. 
Highlights: Through the Passing Seasons was released on 25 September 1988 and had music composed by Kenji Kawai and Takao Sugiyama. 
Side Story: Ikkoku Island Flirtation Story was released 31 January 1991 and used "Kanashimi yo Konnichi wa" as a theme song. Additional music was composed by Kenji Kawai, Takao Sugiyama, and Hideharu Mori.
Prelude, When the Cherry Blossoms Return in the Spring was released 25 June 1992 and also used "Kanashimi yo Konnichi wa" as a theme song. Additional music was composed by Kenji Kawai and Takao Sugiyama.

Live-action television film series
The ending theme for the 2007-2008 two-part Maison Ikkoku television drama series was Mamotte Agetai by Yumi Matsutoya. The song was originally released on 21 June 1981 through Toshiba EMI. At that time, it reached #2 on the Oricon weekly charts and was ranked #10 for singles released in 1981. It sold over 695,000 copies.

The other music used in the drama series was composed by Yoshikazu Suo.

Character songs
This section contains character songs, or songs sung by a voice actor from the series while in character.

Koisuru Ki-Mo-Chi

 was released on LP, cassette, and CD by Kitty Records on 25 September 1987. It featured 15 tracks of incidental music, theme songs, and character songs. All vocals on the album are by Sumi Shimamoto in character as Kyoko Otonashi.

Track listing
  (Vocals: Kyoko Otonashi) 
 SC-1
  (Vocals: Kyoko Otonashi) 
 SC-2
  (Vocals: Kyoko Otonashi) 
 SC-3
  (Vocals: Kyoko Otonashi) 
 SC-4
  (Vocals: Kyoko Otonashi) 
 SC-5
  (Vocals: Kyoko Otonashi) 
 SC-6
  (Vocals: Kyoko Otonashi) 
 SC-7
  (Vocals: Kyoko Otonashi)

Party Album

 is a drama album that was released on CD by Kitty Records on 21 December 1992. It featured 16 tracks, including 8 tracks of theme songs sung by cast members of the Maison Ikkoku anime television series.

Track listing
  (drama)
  (Vocals: Sumi Shimamoto)
  (drama) 
  (Vocals: Kazuyo Aoki as by Hanae Ichinose)
  (Vocals: Shigeru Chiba as by Yotsuya and Issei Futamata as by Yūsaku Godai) 
  (Vocals: Miina Tominaga as by Kozue Nanao)
  (Vocals: Yūko Mita as by Akemi Roppongi)
  (Vocals: Hisako Kyōda as by Yukari Godai)
  (Vocals: Sumi Shimamoto as by Kyoko Otonashi and Issei Futamata as by Yūsaku Godai)
  (Vocals: Picasso) 
 "Ci-ne-ma" (karaoke version)
 "Will Tomorrow Be Sunny?" (karaoke version)
 "Sunny Shiny Morning" (karaoke version)
 "Love Ya" (karaoke version)
 "Hello Sadness" (karaoke version)
 "Fantasy" (karaoke version)

Singles
Listed in chronological release order.

Soundtrack albums
Albums are listed in chronological release order.

Music Blend

 was released  by Kitty Records on LP and cassette on 21 September 1986, and on CD on 21 December 1990. It featured 26 tracks of incidental music, theme songs, and character songs. Vocal artists included on the album included Picasso, Yuki Saito, Sumi Shimamoto, and Takao Kisugi. This album contains almost the same content as Music Cocktail, with the only difference being the first track.

Track listing
  (Vocals: Yuki Saito) 
 
 
  
 
 
 
  (Vocals: Sumi Shimamoto) 
 
 
 
  (Vocals: Takao Kisugi) 
  (Vocals: Sumi Shimamoto) 
  
 
 
 
 
 
 
 
 
 
  
 
  (Vocals: Picasso)

Music Cocktail

 was released on CD by Kitty Records on 21 December 1986. It featured 26 tracks of incidental music, theme songs, and character songs. Vocal artists on the album include Takao Kisugi, Picasso, and Sumi Shimamoto. This album contains almost the same content as Music Blend, with the only difference being the first track.

Track listing
  (Vocals: Picasso) 
 
 
  
 
 
 
  (Vocals: Sumi Shimamoto) 
 
 
 
  (Vocals: Takao Kisugi) 
  (Vocals: Sumi Shimamoto) 
  
 
 
 
 
 
 
 
 
 
  
 
  (Vocals: Picasso)

Music Blend 2

 was released  by Kitty Records on LP, cassette, and CD on 1 July 1987. It featured 27 tracks of incidental music and theme songs. Vocal artists included on the album included Anzen Chitai, Kiyonori Matsuo, Picasso, and Yuki Saito.

Track listing
 
  (Vocals: Kiyonori Matsuo)
  
 
 
  (Vocals: Yuki Saito) 
 
 
 
 
  (Vocals: Picasso) 
  (Vocals: Anzen Chitai) 
 
 
  
  
 
 
 
  (Vocals: Picasso)

Final OST

 was released on LP, cassette, and CD by Kitty Records on 21 February 1988. It featured the theme song and 15 tracks of incidental music from the theatrical movie. The theme song vocal artist was Rika Himenogi.

Track listing
 "I Love You"
 "Widow's Lover"
 "A Breath of Air"
 "American Woman"
 "In the Moonlight"
 "Crystal Heart"
 "6•6•6"
  
 "Wedding Dress"
  
 "Grandmother"
  
 "She-Inn"
 "I Need Her"
 
  (Vocals: Rika Himenogi)

Music Sour

 was released on LP, cassette, and CD by Kitty Records on 21 December 1988. It featured 61 tracks of incidental music and instrumental versions of two of the theme songs. Twelve of the tracks were not included in the LP release.

Track listing
Songs marked with ♦ are not on the LP.
 
  
  
  
  
  
  
  
  
  
  
  
  
  
  
  
  
  
  ♦
  ♦
  
  
  
  
  
  
  
  
  ♦
  ♦
  ♦
  
  
  
  
  
  
  
  
  
  ♦
  
  
  ♦
  ♦
  ♦
  
  
  ♦
  
  ♦
  
  ♦

Music Shake

 was released on cassette and CD by Kitty Records on 21 December 1989. It featured 56 tracks of incidental music and theme songs. Vocal artists included on the album include Gilbert O'Sullivan and Picasso.

Track listing
  
  (Vocals: Picasso) 
 
  
  
  
  
  
  
  
  
  
  
  
  
  
  
  
  
  
  
  
  
  
  
  
  
  
  
  
  
  
  
  
  
  
  
  
  
  
  
  
  
  
  
   
  
  
  
  
  
  
  
  
  
  
  
  
  
  (Vocals: Gilbert O'Sullivan)

Theme Song Best+

 was released on CD by Pony Canyon on 17 March 1999. It featured 14 tracks of theme and in-character songs from the TV series and theatrical film. Vocal artists included on the album included Anzen Chitai, Rika Himenogi, Takao Kisugi, Kiyonori Matsuo, Kōzō Murashita, Gilbert O'Sullivan, Picasso, Yuki Saito, and Sumi Shimamoto.

Track listing
  (Vocals: Yuki Saito) 
  (Vocals: Takao Kisugi)
  (Vocals: Picasso) 
  (Vocals: Gilbert O'Sullivan) 
  (Vocals: Gilbert O'Sullivan) 
  (Vocals: Anzen Chitai) 
  (Vocals: Picasso) 
  (Vocals: Kiyonori Matsuo)
  (Vocals: Picasso)
  (Vocals: Kōzō Murashita)
  (Vocals: Picasso) 
  (Vocals: Rika Himenogi)
  (Vocals: Sumi Shimamoto)
  (Vocals: Sumi Shimamoto)

Definitive Theme & Character Songs

 was released on CD by Pony Canyon on 19 August 2015. It featured two discs with a total of 63 tracks of theme songs, in-character songs, and background music from the anime TV series and film. Vocal artists included on the album included Anzen Chitai, Rika Himenogi, Takao Kisugi, Kiyonori Matsuo, Kōzō Murashita, Gilbert O'Sullivan, Picasso, Yuki Saito, and Sumi Shimamoto.

Track listing (disc 1)
  (Vocals: Yuki Saito) 
  (Vocals: Takao Kisugi)
  (Vocals: Picasso) 
  (Vocals: Gilbert O'Sullivan) 
  (Vocals: Gilbert O'Sullivan) 
  (Vocals: Anzen Chitai) 
  (Vocals: Picasso) 
  (Vocals: Kiyonori Matsuo)
  (Vocals: Picasso)
  (Vocals: Kōzō Murashita)
  (Vocals: Picasso) 
  (Vocals: Rika Himenogi)
  (Vocals: Sumi Shimamoto singing as Kyoko Otonashi) 
  (Vocals: Sumi Shimamoto singing as Kyoko Otonashi)
  (Vocals: Sumi Shimamoto singing as Kyoko Otonashi)
  (Vocals: Sumi Shimamoto singing as Kyoko Otonashi)
  (Vocals: Sumi Shimamoto singing as Kyoko Otonashi)
  (Vocals: Sumi Shimamoto singing as Kyoko Otonashi)
  (Vocals: Sumi Shimamoto singing as Kyoko Otonashi)
  (Vocals: Sumi Shimamoto singing as Kyoko Otonashi)

Track listing (disc 2)

Drama albums
Drama albums contain the audio track of TV episodes, films, and radio dramas.

Perfect Recording

 was released on 21 March 1988 by Pony Canyon on LP and cassette, and on CD by Kitty Records. It featured 16 tracks of audio drama and theme songs. The music was composed by Hideharu Mori (of Picasso. The vocal artist for the theme song was Rika Himenogi.

Track listing
  
 "Crystal Heart"
 "Wedding Dress"
 "Widow's Lover"
 "American Woman"
 "She-Inn"
 "A Breath of Air"
  
 
  
 "I Need Her"
 "6•6•6"
 "In the Moonlight"
 "I Love You"
 "In the Moonlight"
  (Vocals: Rika Himenogi)

Sound Theater
There were 48 volumes in the original  CD series, released by Kitty Records from 25 May 1990 to 25 July 1991. These contain the audio from the 96 anime television series episodes, similar to a radio drama, as well as guest segments with various celebrities.

 was released as a CD by Kitty Records on 25 June 1991. It contained audio from the Side Story: Ikkoku Island Flirtation Story and Prelude, When the Cherry Blossoms Return in the Spring OVAs.

Music calendars
Five music calendars were released between 1989 and 1993. All of them included a calendar, and three included a cassette or CD with a collection of instrumental or arranged music from the series. The 1991 release included original background music and an original story with Sumi Shimamoto (Kyoko) narrating. The 1994 music calendar was released only on VHS and included a digest version of the anime TV series and a segment about Yotsuya's secrets.

Music Calendar 1990

 was released on cassette by Kitty Records in November 1989. It featured 12 tracks of instrumental and arranged versions of theme songs, with some narration by Sumi Shimamoto.

Track listing

Music Calendar 1991

 was released on CD by Kitty Records in November 1990. It featured an original Maison Ikkoku story narrated by Sumi Shimamoto, and it used original background music.

Music Calendar 1992

 was released on CD by Kitty Records on 25 December 1991. It featured 12 tracks of instrumental and arranged versions of theme songs.

Track listing

Music Calendar 1993

 was released on CD by Kitty Records on 21 December 1992. It featured 5 tracks of theme music arranged in a music box style.

Track listing

Music Calendar 1994

 was released on VHS by Kitty Records in December 1993. It featured a short segment delving into Yotsuya's secrets, as well as a digest version of the anime television series. The video is narrated by Shigeru Chiba.

Other
There were two large collections, one collecting all of the songs released as CD singles, and one collecting all music used in the Maison Ikkoku TV series, the theatrical film, and all of the songs sung by voice actors while in character. They are listed in chronological release order. 
The Maison Ikkoku CD Single Memorial File was released on 11 July 1988 by Kitty Records. It includes thirteen 8 cm CD singles containing two songs each, a 12 cm CD adapter, and a booklet containing all of the lyrics for the included songs. It was also released on two cassette tapes in December 1989.
It includes eight CDs containing all the theme songs used during the TV series and in the theatrical film, as well as all of the incidental music used throughout the series (background music by Takao Sugiyama (eps 1-26, 38-96) and Kenji Kawai (eps 27-96), eyecatches, and insert songs), music from the theatrical film, and a reissue of Koisuru Ki-Mo-Chi.

Forever Remix

 was released on CD by Kitty Records on 25 July 1991. It featured 10 tracks of remixed theme and character songs. Vocal artists included on the album included Takao Kisugi, Kiyonori Matsuo, Picasso, and Sumi Shimamoto.

Track listing
  (Carmen Mix, vocals: Picasso) 
  (Cee-light Mix, vocals: Kiyonori Matsuo) 
  (Hook of Dub Mix, vocals: Picasso) 
  (Jam-Slam-ica Mix, vocals: Picasso) 
  (Neanderthal Mix, vocals: Picasso) 
  (Jet Jet Jet Mix, vocals: Takao Kisugi) 
  (Cro-Magnon Mix, vocals: Picasso) 
  (Original Mix, vocals: Picasso) 
  (Eternallove Mix, vocals: Sumi Shimamoto as by Kyoko Otonashi) 
  (Rough Mix, vocals: Sumi Shimamoto as by Kyoko Otonashi)

Original Dramatic Sound Track

 is a pachinko/pachislot game soundtrack released on CD by Heiwa on 12 June 2012. It featured 10 tracks of music from games released by Heiwa and their subsidiary, Olympia. The album was only available from the Heiwa website for a limited time.

Track listing
 
  (Vocals: Ichiko) 
 
  (Vocals: Ichiko) 
 "Non Stop = Lucky Days" (Vocals: Ichiko) 
  (Vocals: Ichiko) 
 "My Days" (Vocals: Ichiko) 
 "Seasons" (Vocals: Ichiko) 
 
  (Vocals: Ichiko)

I'm So Glad I Met You OST

 was released on CD by Olympia (a subsidiary of Heiwa) in 2010. It featured four tracks of music from the pachislot game.

Track listing
 "Non Stop = Lucky Days" (Vocals: Ichiko) 
 "My Days" (Vocals: Ichiko) 
 "Seasons" (Vocals: Ichiko) 
  (Vocals: Ichiko)

References

Discography
Anime soundtracks
Film soundtracks
Film and television discographies
Video game music discographies